As a nickname, Happy may refer to:

In arts and entertainment 

 Happy Caldwell (1903–1978), American jazz clarinetist and tenor saxophonist
 Howard Goodman, gospel musician, founder of the Happy Goodman Family
 Happy Hammond (1917–c. 1998), Australian comedian and children's show host
 Happy Jankell (born 1993), Swedish actress
 Helen Reichert (1901–2011), American talk show personality and university professor
 Happy Rhodes (born 1965), American singer, songwriter and musician
 Happy Traum (born 1938), American folk musician
 David "Happy" Williams (born 1946), US-based Trinidadian jazz double-bassist

In politics 

 John Newbold Camp (1908–1987), American politician
 Happy Chandler (1898–1991), American senator and Governor of Kentucky and Commissioner of Major League Baseball
 Happy Rockefeller (1926–2015), widow of former Vice President of the United States Nelson Rockefeller

In sports 

 Jack Chesbro (1874–1931), American Major League Baseball pitcher nicknamed "Happy Jack"
 Happy Feller (born 1949), American former National Football League kicker
 Happy Felsch (1891–1964), American Major League Baseball player
 Happy Finneran (1890–1942), American Major League Baseball player
 Happy Foreman (1899–1953), American Major League Baseball relief pitcher
 Happy Hairston (1942–2001), American National Basketball Association player
 Pat Hartnett (baseball) (1863–1935), American Major League Baseball player for part of one season
 Kevin Harvick (born 1975), American NASCAR driver nicknamed "Happy Harvick"
 Burt Hooton (born 1950), American former Major League Baseball pitcher and coach
 Happy Jele (born 1987), South African association football defender
 Archie McKain (1911–1985), American Major League Baseball pitcher
 Jeff Shulman (born 1975), American poker player and magazine editor
 Jack Stivetts (1868–1930), American Major League Baseball pitcher nicknamed "Happy Jack"
 George Wilson (rugby), Scottish rugby union and rugby league footballer who played in the 1940s and 1950s

See also

 Amadeus IX, Duke of Savoy (1435–1472), nicknamed "the Happy"
 Hap (nickname)

Lists of people by nickname